African carp is a common name that may refer to several different species of fishes:

 The Tana Labeo, Labeo mesops
 The Cornish jack, Mormyrops anguilloides
 Labeo brachypoma
 Labeo coubie
 Labeo cylindricus
 Labeo parvus
 Labeo senegalensis
 Mormyrops oudoti

See also
Carp